Dominique Curry (born August 16, 1988) is an American football wide receiver  who is currently a free agent. After playing college football for California University of Pennsylvania, he was signed by the St. Louis Rams as an undrafted free agent in 2010.

Early years
Curry was a three-sport star (basketball, football and track) at George Washington High School in Philadelphia.

College career
Curry finished his collegiate career at California University (PA) in 2009 after playing three seasons at Cheyney University. At Cheyney, he had 134 receptions for 2,002 yards and 14 touchdowns. He recorded 13 special teams tackles and blocked two kicks during his only season at California and recorded four catches for 100 yards and a touchdown as a senior.

He caught 134 balls for 2,202 yards and 14 touchdowns while at Cheyney and was a three-time All-Pennsylvania State Athletic Conference East selection and was named PSAC East Rookie of the Year in 2006 after catching 63 passes for 1,035 yards and seven touchdowns. He also played basketball for four years at Cheyney, where he scored 1,079 career points and grabbed 606 career rebounds.

Professional career

Pre-draft
Curry was part of a group of 10 standout football players from college programs around Western Pennsylvania who participated in a Pro Day at Adamson Stadium on March 30, 2010. Curry and the nine others were tested in a variety of NFL Combine-style drills, such as the 3-cone drill, vertical jump and 40-yard dash. Curry measured 6'2", 225 pounds and his 40-time was 4.61.

St. Louis Rams
Curry signed with the St. Louis Rams as an undrafted rookie free agent on May 3, 2010, after attending the team's rookie minicamp on a tryout basis. He made the Rams 53-man opening day roster and played in two games in 2010. In Week 3 of the 2010 NFL Season vs. the Washington Redskins, Curry blocked Redskins' punter Graham Gano's punt before suffering a season ending ACL injury. Curry was active for all 16 games during the 2011 NFL season, but did not catch a pass.

Detroit Lions
Curry was signed by the Detroit Lions on July 23, 2012.

Curry signed a futures contract with the Detroit Lions on January 1, 2013. He was released on June 17, 2013.

San Jose SaberCats
Curry was assigned to the Arena Football League's San Jose SaberCats on December 20, 2013.

Philadelphia Soul
On December 29, 2014, Curry was traded to the Philadelphia Soul for claim order positioning.

References

External links
Detroit Lions bio
St. Louis Rams bio

1987 births
Living people
Players of American football from Philadelphia
American football wide receivers
California Vulcans football players
St. Louis Rams players
Detroit Lions players
Carolina Panthers players
San Jose SaberCats players
Philadelphia Soul players